Shuko Aoyama and Yang Zhaoxuan were the defending champions, but chose not to participate.

Nao Hibino and Makoto Ninomiya won the title, defeating Sofia Shapatava and Emily Webley-Smith in the final, 6–4, 6–0.

Seeds

Draw

Draw

References

External Links
Main Draw

Shenzhen Longhua Open - Doubles